Albert Ollie Connor (28 August 1914 – 20 October 1989) was a United States Army lieutenant general who served as commanding officer of the Third United States Army from 1969 to 1972. He previously served as the U.S. Army Deputy Chief of Staff for Personnel from 1967 to 1969.

Early life and education
Born and raised in Helena, Montana, Connor attended the United States Military Academy. He graduated with a B.S. degree in 1937 and was commissioned as a second lieutenant of field artillery. Connor later graduated from the Army Command and General Staff College in 1946 and the Army War College in 1952.

Military career
As a junior officer, Connor was assigned to 3rd Infantry Division Artillery. During World War II, he helped to plan and then participated in assault landings in North Africa, in Sicily, at Anzio and in Southern France. In November 1944, Connor was transferred to the VI Corps headquarters staff. He was awarded two Bronze Star Medals and a Purple Heart.

In August 1947, Connor transferred from the field artillery to the infantry. He received parachute training and then served as a battalion commander in the 187th Airborne Infantry, 11th Airborne Division at Camp Campbell. Promoted to colonel in 1948, Connor was given command of the 503rd Airborne Infantry Regiment in January 1951 at Fort Campbell (renamed in 1950).

During the Korean War, Connor commanded the 27th Infantry, 25th Infantry Division and later served as deputy chief of staff for X Corps.

Promoted to brigadier general in 1960, he became deputy commanding general of Fort Dix in March 1961. Promoted to major general in 1964, he served as commanding officer of the 3rd Infantry Division in Germany. Connor helped to obtain permission from Disney Productions to use Walt Disney's Rocky the Bulldog cartoon character as a symbol for the "dogface soldiers" of the 3rd ID.

After serving five years as a lieutenant general, Connor retired from active duty on 2 June 1972.

Personal
Connor was the son of Charles Ollie Connor (19 December 1884 – 28 September 1939) and Marguerite P. (Simon) Connor (1 January 1889 – 6 October 1974). They were married in Helena, Montana on 11 September 1913.

Connor married Betty Schofield Stewart (16 October 1918 – 28 July 2005) on 1 June 1938 at the Cathedral of Saint Helena. They had two sons, a daughter and four grandchildren. One son became a Catholic priest and the other served in the U.S. Army, retiring as a colonel.

Connor and his wife settled at Hilton Head Island, South Carolina after his retirement. They were buried at the West Point Cemetery.

References

1914 births
1989 deaths
People from Helena, Montana
United States Military Academy alumni
United States Army personnel of World War II
United States Army Command and General Staff College alumni
United States Army War College alumni
United States Army personnel of the Korean War
Recipients of the Legion of Merit
United States Army generals
Recipients of the Distinguished Service Medal (US Army)
People from Hilton Head, South Carolina
Burials at West Point Cemetery